VELAGALERU is a village in NTR District, Andhra Pradesh, India.  It is 15 km from Vijayawada.

Villages in Krishna district